Cassowaries are flightless birds of the genus Casuarius in the order Casuariiformes. They are classified as ratites (flightless birds without a keel on their sternum bones) and are native to the tropical forests of New Guinea (Papua New Guinea and West Papua), Aru Islands (Maluku), and northeastern Australia.

Three species are extant: The most common, the southern cassowary, is the third-tallest and second-heaviest living bird, smaller only than the ostrich and emu. The other two species are represented by the northern cassowary and the dwarf cassowary; the northern cassowary is the most recently discovered and the most threatened. A fourth but extinct species is represented by the pygmy cassowary.

Cassowaries feed mainly on fruit, although all species are truly omnivorous and take a range of other plant foods, including shoots and grass seeds, in addition to fungi, invertebrates, and small vertebrates. Cassowaries are very wary of humans, but if provoked, they are capable of inflicting serious, even fatal, injuries to both dogs and people. The cassowary has often been labeled "the world's most dangerous bird".

Taxonomy, systematics, and evolution 
The genus Casuarius was erected by French scientist Mathurin Jacques Brisson in his  published in 1760. The type species is the southern cassowary (Casuarius casuarius). The Swedish naturalist Carl Linnaeus had introduced the genus Casuarius in the sixth edition of his  published in 1748, but Linnaeus dropped the genus in the important tenth edition of 1758 and put the southern cassowary together with the common ostrich and the greater rhea in the genus Struthio. As the publication date of Linnaeus's sixth edition was before the 1758 starting point of the International Commission on Zoological Nomenclature, Brisson, and not Linnaeus, is considered the authority for the genus.

Cassowaries (from ) are part of the ratite group, which also includes the emu, rheas, ostriches, and kiwi, as well as the extinct moas and elephant birds. These species are recognised:

Most authorities consider the taxonomic classification above to be monotypic, but several subspecies of each have been described, and some of them have even been suggested as separate species, e.g., C. (b) papuanus. The taxonomic name C. (b) papuanus also may be in need of revision to Casuarius (bennetti) westermanni. Validation of these subspecies has proven difficult due to individual variations, age-related variations, the scarcity of specimens, the stability of specimens (the bright skin of the head and neck—the basis of describing several subspecies—fades in specimens), and the practice of trading live cassowaries for thousands of years, some of which are likely to have escaped or been deliberately introduced to regions away from their origin.

The evolutionary history of cassowaries, as of all ratites, is not well known. Genetic evidence suggests that their closest living relatives are emus, and that the dwarf cassowary is more closely related to the Northern Cassowary than either is to the Southern cassowary. A fossil species was reported from Australia, but for reasons of biogeography, this assignment is not certain, and it might belong to the prehistoric Emuarius, which was a genus of cassowary-like primitive emus.

Description 

Typically, all cassowaries are shy birds that are found in the deep forest. They are adept at disappearing long before a human knows they were there. The southern cassowary of the far north Queensland rain forests is not well studied, and the northern and dwarf cassowaries even less so. Females are larger and more brightly coloured than the males.

All cassowaries' feathers consist of a shaft and loose barbules. They do not have rectrices (tail feathers) or a preen gland. Cassowaries have small wings with five or six large remiges. These are reduced to stiff, keratinous quills, resembling porcupine quills, with no barbs. The furcula and coracoid are degenerate, and their palatal bones and sphenoid bones touch each other. These, along with their wedge-shaped body, are thought to be adaptations to ward off vines, thorns, and saw-edged leaves, allowing them to run quickly through the rainforest.

Cassowaries have three-toed feet with sharp claws. This claw is particularly fearsome, since cassowaries sometimes kick humans and other animals with their powerful legs. They are good swimmers, crossing wide rivers and swimming in the sea.

All three species have a keratinous, skin-covered casque on their heads that grows with age. C. casuarius has the largest and C. bennetti the smallest (tricorn shape), with C. unappendiculatus having variations in between. Contrary to earlier findings, the hollow inside of the casque is spanned with fine fibers.

Several functions for the casque have been proposed. One is that they are a secondary sexual characteristic. Other suggested functions include batting through the underbrush, as a weapon in dominance disputes, or pushing aside leaf litter during foraging. The latter three are disputed by biologist Andrew Mack, whose personal observation suggests that the casque amplifies deep sounds. This is related to a discovery that at least the dwarf cassowary and southern cassowary produce very low-frequency sounds, which may aid in communication in dense rainforests. The "boom" vocalization that cassowaries produce is the lowest-frequency bird call known and is at the lower limit of human hearing. Recent study suggests that casque acts as a thermal radiator, offloading heat at high temperatures and restricting heat loss at low temperatures.

The average lifespan of wild cassowaries is believed to be about 40 to 50 years.

Behaviour and ecology 
Cassowaries are solitary birds except during courtship, egg-laying, and sometimes around ample food supplies. Female cassowary have larger territories, overlapping those of several males. While females move among satellite territories of different males, they appear to remain within the same territories for most of their lives, mating with the same, or closely related, males over the course of their lives.

Courtship and pair-bonding rituals begin with the vibratory sounds broadcast by females. Males approach and run with their necks parallel to the ground while making dramatic movements of their heads, which accentuate the frontal neck region. The female approaches drumming slowly. The male crouches on the ground, and the female either steps on the male's back for a moment before crouching beside him in preparation for copulation, or she may attack. This is often the case with the females pursuing the males in ritualistic chasing behaviours that generally terminate in water. The male cassowary dives into water and submerges himself up to his upper neck and head. The female pursues him into the water, where he eventually drives her to the shallows, where she crouches making ritualistic motions of her head. The two may remain in copulation for extended periods of time. In some cases, another male may approach and run off the first male. He will climb onto her to copulate, as well.

Males are far more tolerant of one another than females, which do not tolerate the presence of other females.

Reproduction 

The cassowary breeding season starts in May to June. Females lay three to eight large, bright green or pale green-blue eggs in each clutch into a heap of leaf litter prepared by the male. The eggs measure about  – only ostrich and emu eggs are larger.

The male incubates those eggs for 50–52 days, removing or adding litter to regulate the temperature, then protects the chicks, which stay in the nest for about 9 months. He defends them fiercely against all potential predators, including humans. The young males later go off to find a territory of their own.

The female does not care for the eggs or the chicks, but rather moves on within her territory to lay eggs in the nests of several other males. Young cassowaries are brown and have buffy stripes. They are often kept as pets in native villages (in New Guinea), where they are permitted to roam like barnyard fowl. Often they are kept until they become nearly grown and someone gets hurt. Mature cassowaries are placed beside native houses in cribs hardly larger than the birds themselves. Garbage and other vegetable food is fed to them, and they live for years in such enclosures; in some areas, their plumage is still as valuable as shell money. Caged birds are regularly bereft of their fresh plumes.

Diet 

Cassowaries are predominantly frugivorous, but omnivorous opportunistically when small prey is available. Besides fruits, their diet includes flowers, fungi, snails, insects, frogs, birds, fish, rats, mice, and carrion. Fruit from at least 26 plant families has been documented in the diet of cassowaries. Fruits from the laurel, podocarp, palm, wild grape, nightshade, and myrtle families are important items in the diet. The cassowary plum takes its name from the bird.

Where trees are dropping fruit, cassowaries come in and feed, with each bird defending a tree from others for a few days. They move on when the fruit is depleted. Fruit, even items as large as bananas and apples, is swallowed whole. Cassowaries are a keystone species of rain forests because they eat fallen fruit whole and distribute seeds across the jungle floor via excrement.

Role in seed dispersal and germination 

Cassowaries feed on the fruit of several hundred rainforest species and usually pass viable seeds in large, dense scats. They are known to disperse seeds over distances greater than a kilometre,  thus playing an important role in the ecosystem. Germination rates for seeds of the rare Australian rainforest tree Ryparosa were found to be much higher after passing through a cassowary's gut (92% versus 4%).

Predators 
Adult cassowaries have no natural enemies other than humans, but their chicks are vulnerable to large pythons, monitor lizards, New Guinea singing dogs, and Papuan eagles. Adult males aggressively defend their chicks.

As for eating the cassowary, it is supposed to be quite tough. Australian administrative officers stationed in New Guinea were advised that it "should be cooked with a stone in the pot: when the stone is ready to eat, so is the cassowary".

Distribution and habitat 
Cassowaries are native to the humid rainforests of New Guinea, nearby smaller islands, East Nusa Tenggara, the Maluku Islands, and  northeastern Australia. They do, however, venture out into palm scrub, grassland, savanna, and swamp forest. Whether some island populations are natural or the result of human trade in young birds is unclear. They can also be easily spotted in some national parks such as Mellwraith Range National Park, Paluma Range National Park, and Jardine National Park in Australia.

Status and conservation 

The southern cassowary is endangered in Queensland. Kofron and Chapman, when they assessed the decline of this species, found that of the former cassowary habitat, only 20–25% remains. Habitat loss and fragmentation is the primary cause of decline. They then studied 140 cases of cassowary mortality, and found that motor-vehicle strikes accounted for 55% of the deaths, and dog attacks produced another 18%. Remaining causes of death included hunting (five cases), entanglement in wire (one case), the removal of cassowaries that attacked humans (four cases), and natural causes (18 cases), including tuberculosis (four cases). The cause for 14 cases was indicated as "for unknown reasons".

Hand feeding cassowaries poses a significant threat to their survival because it lures them into suburban areas. There, the birds are more susceptible to encounters with vehicles and dogs. Contact with humans encourages cassowaries to take food from picnic tables. Feral pigs also are a significant threat to their survival. They destroy nests and eggs of cassowaries, but their worst effect is as competitors for food, which may be catastrophic for the cassowaries during lean times.

In February 2011, Cyclone Yasi destroyed a large area of cassowary habitat, endangering 200 of the birds – about 10% of the total Australian population.

The Mission Beach community in far north Queensland holds an annual Cassowary Festival in September, where funds are raised to map the bird's habitat.

In captivity 
The cassowary has solitary habits and breeds less frequently in zoos than other ratites such as ostrich and emu. Unlike other ratites, it lives exclusively in tropical rainforest, and  reproducing this habitat carefully is essential. Unlike the emu, which will live with other sympatric species, such as kangaroos, in "mixed Australian fauna" displays, the cassowary does not cohabit well among its own kind. Individual specimens must even be kept in separate enclosures, due to their solitary and aggressive nature. Territoriality is one of their most important characteristics.

The double-wattled cassowary (C. casuarius) is the most popular species in captivity, and it is fairly common in European and American zoos, where it is known for its unmistakable appearance.  only Weltvogelpark Walsrode in Germany has all three species of cassowaries in its collection: single-wattled cassowary (Casuarius unappendiculatus) and Bennett's cassowary (Casuarius bennetti). If subspecies are recognised, Weltvogelpark Walsrode has C. b. westermanni and C. u. rufotinctus.

Relationship with humans

Role in Papuan cultures and semi-domestication 

There is evidence that the cassowary may have been domesticated by humans thousands of years before the chicken.  Some New Guinea Highlands societies capture cassowary chicks and raise them as semi-tame poultry, for use in ceremonial gift exchanges and as food. They are the only indigenous Australasian animal known to have been partly domesticated by people prior to European arrival and colonization. The Maring people of Kundagai sacrificed cassowaries (C. bennetti) in certain rituals. The Kalam people considered themselves related to cassowaries, and did not classify them as birds, but as kin.

Studies on Pleistocene/early Holocene cassowary remains in Papua suggest that indigenous people at the time preferred to harvest eggs rather than adults. They seem to have regulated their consumption of these birds, possibly even collecting eggs and rearing young birds as one of the earliest forms of domestication.

Attacks 
Cassowaries have a reputation for being dangerous to people and domestic animals. During World War II, American and Australian troops stationed in New Guinea were warned to steer clear of them. In his 1958 book Living Birds of the World, ornithologist Ernest Thomas Gilliard wrote:

The inner or second of the three toes is fitted with a long, straight, murderous nail which can sever an arm or eviscerate an abdomen with ease. There are many records of natives being killed by this bird.

This assessment of the danger posed by cassowaries has been repeated in print by authors, including Gregory S. Paul and Jared Diamond. A 2003 historical study of 221 cassowary attacks showed that 150 had been against humans; 75% of these had been from cassowaries that had been fed by people, 71% of the time the bird had chased or charged the victim, and 15% of the time they kicked. Of the attacks, 73% involved the birds expecting or snatching food, 5% involved defending their natural food sources, 15% involved defending themselves from attack, and 7% involved defending their chicks or eggs. Only one human death was reported among those 150 attacks.

The first documented human death caused by a cassowary was on April 6, 1926. In Australia, 16-year-old Phillip McClean and his brother, age 13, came across a cassowary on their property and decided to try to kill it by striking it with clubs. The bird kicked the younger boy, who fell and ran away as his older brother struck the bird. The older McClean then tripped and fell to the ground. While he was on the ground, the cassowary kicked him in the neck, opening a  wound that may have severed his jugular vein. The boy died of his injuries shortly thereafter.

Cassowary strikes to the abdomen are among the rarest of all, but in one case, a dog was kicked in the belly in 1995. The blow left no puncture, but severe bruising occurred. The dog later died from an apparent intestinal rupture.

Another human death due to a cassowary was recorded in Florida on April 12, 2019. The bird's owner, a 75-year-old man who had raised the animal, was apparently clawed to death after he fell to the ground.

See also 
 Corythoraptor
 Dromaeosauridae

References

Citations

Cited texts 

 
 
 
  Cites "authorities" for the death claim.

Uncited text 
 Rothschild, Walter (1899). A Monograph of the Genus Casuarius. Transactions of the Zoological Society of London, vol. 15, pt. 5, December 1900.

External links 

 Images and movies of the southern cassowary (Casuarius casuarius)—ARKive
 C4 Community for Coastal and Cassowary Conservation—Based in Mission Beach
 Video: Cassowary with 3 chicks drinking water at Elantra Resort, Mission Beach
 Cassowary videos, photos and sounds on the Internet Bird Collection
 

 
 
Extant Zanclean first appearances
Flightless birds
Higher-level bird taxa restricted to the Australasia-Pacific region